Ovayok may refer to:

Mount Pelly, the Inuinnaqtun name for the mountain
Ovayok Territorial Park, of which the mountain forms part